Kathleen S. Dunn is an American certified dialect coach, accent reduction coach, voice and body movement instructor, and professional actress.

Background
Prior to dialect coaching, Dunn assisted casting director Mali Finn on numerous feature films, as well as apprenticing in the capacity of screen test reader. Dunn is a professional TV/film/stage actress starting in 1987. Her credits include leading roles in the films Cold Intelligence (2004) with  Michael Denney, The Joyriders (1999) with Martin Landau, and Fish, a Project Greenlight film and a short film Tilly. Theatre companies in Los Angeles where Kathy Dunn performed since 1987 include: The Los Angeles Women's Shakespeare Company; Evidence Room; Odyssey Theatre; Workshop 360 and Los Angeles Theatre Company. Her stage performances have won her numerous awards in the Los Angeles Area. Actors such as Robert Easton  (past) and Kathleen S Dunn (current) have had their career start in Dialect Coaching & Accent Reduction at the School of Theatre at the University of Southern California (USC).

Dialects theory
Kathleen Dunn is most known for "uniting voice, body and imagination" in coaching and her Dialects Theory of providing the "Ears of the Actor".

Dialect coaching for film
Dunn's approach as a dialect coach considers all regional and non-regional accent needs as well as the integration of voice/body movement and Lessac theories into accent and dialect training.

References

External links
 
 Voice and Speech Trainers Association
 Kathleen S. Dunn Voice and Speech Trainers Association
 Lessac

American film actresses
American stage actresses
American television actresses
Year of birth missing (living people)
Language teachers
Living people
University of Southern California people
21st-century American women